Aiolou Street (also Eolou Street) is a street in downtown Athens, the Greek capital.  It is named after Aeolus, the god of winds in Greek mythology.  The street is one-way and originally ran entirely southbound but since the closure of Athinas Street in the late-1990s as part of the renovation plan, the part north of Lykourgou Street is one-way northbound.  The street begins in Pelopidas Street further south of Ermou Street and ends in Panepistimiou Street (Eleftheriou Venizelou Avenue) and north of this street is 28 Oktovriou or Patission Street.

History

The street was first laid in the 19th century and was the first street in Athens to be paved.  Neoclassical buildings were built then as well and are still present today in the southern and the central part of the street.  After World War II and the Greek Civil War, modern eight to ten storey buildings were built in the northern part and traffic lights were installed on Adrianou, Ermou, Evrypidou, Sofokleous, Stadiou and Panepistimiou/28 Oktovriou (Patission) intersections.  The blocks around the intersection with Stadiou Street are traditionally called the Hafteia, so named after a popular 19th-century kafeneíon owned by a certain Mr. Haftis; the Hafteia were the very heart of downtown Athens market for the 19th and the better part of the 20th century.

Intersections
Pelopidou Street
Adrianou Street - east
Pandrosou Street
Mitropoleos Street
Ermou Street
Hagias Eirinis and Athenaidos Streets
Voreou Street - west
Kolokotroni Street - walkway
Miltiadou Street - east
Vyssis Street - west
Sosipyliotissis Street
Evripidou Street
Sofokleous Street
Eupolidos and I. Stavrou Streets
Lykourgou Street - west
Stadiou Street
Panepistimiou Street and Patission Street

See also
 List of streets in Athens

External links
 Photos of Aiolou street

Streets in Athens